Weerakumara Dissanayake (born 10 April 1971) is a Sri Lankan politician and former member of the Parliament of Sri Lanka. He is a member of the Sri Lanka Freedom Party and member of the United People's Freedom Alliance (UPFA).
He was deputy minister of Ministry of Traditional Industries and Small Enterprise Development from 2010 to 2015. In 2017 he left the National Freedom Front (NFF) to join the Sri Lanka Freedom Party.

Political career
In the 2004 General Elections Weerakumara contested the Puttalam Electorate from the United People's Freedom Alliance and was elected. On 2 April 2018, Weerakumara was appointed as the State Minister of Mahaweli Development.

Electoral history

References

Parliament profile

Living people
United People's Freedom Alliance politicians
Sri Lankan Buddhists
Members of the 14th Parliament of Sri Lanka
Members of the 15th Parliament of Sri Lanka
Members of the 16th Parliament of Sri Lanka
Jathika Nidahas Peramuna politicians
Janatha Vimukthi Peramuna politicians
1971 births